Olema is an unincorporated community in the U.S. state of Washington.

A post office called Olema was established in 1896, and remained in operation until 1924.

References

Unincorporated communities in Okanogan County, Washington
Unincorporated communities in Washington (state)
Populated places in the Okanagan Country